Vatku is a village in Haljala Parish, Lääne-Viru County, in northeastern Estonia. It lies on the right bank of the Loobu River.

References

 

Villages in Lääne-Viru County
Kreis Wierland